Lynda "Lindy" Blanchard (born July 4, 1959) is an American businesswoman, diplomat, and political candidate who served as the United States Ambassador to Slovenia from 2019 until 2021, serving under former President Donald Trump and his administration. She was a candidate in the 2022 Alabama gubernatorial election, having switched to that race from the Senate election.

Early life and education
Blanchard is a native of Montgomery, Alabama. She earned a Bachelor of Science degree in mathematics, with a minor in computer science, from Auburn University in 1991.

Career
In 2004, Blanchard founded the 100X Development Foundation, a non-profit organization based in Montgomery, Alabama. Blanchard is also the founder and former senior advisor of B&M Management Company, a real estate investment firm.

Blanchard was nominated as United States Ambassador to Slovenia by President Donald Trump in June 2018. On July 18, 2019, she was confirmed for the ambassadorship by the U.S. Senate with a 55–41 vote. Blanchard resigned from the post following the inauguration of President Joe Biden and was succeeded by Susan K. Falatko as Charge d'Affaires.

2022 Alabama elections
In February 2021, Blanchard announced her candidacy for the 2022 Senate election in Alabama to replace the retiring Senator Richard Shelby, the first candidate to publicly launch a campaign.

Blanchard's most significant opposition was Representative Mo Brooks, who was, at that point, endorsed by former President Donald Trump. In November 2021, The Wall Street Journal reported that Trump was considering endorsing Blanchard if she withdrew her Senate campaign and ran for governor instead. However, such an endorsement never occurred.

Blanchard officially switched races on December 7, 2021, announcing during a campaign stop in Wetumpka that she would be running in the 2022 Alabama gubernatorial election instead of the Senate race. Her gubernatorial campaign launched a television advertising campaign on January 3, 2022, which cost approximately $1.175 million, in order to raise her profile among voters in Alabama.

In the May 24 primary, Blanchard finished in second place in the gubernatorial race, with 19% of the vote. However, the election did not go to a run-off, as incumbent Governor Kay Ivey surpassed the threshold to avoid a run-off. Blanchard conceded defeat to Ivey but also indicated that she was interested in pursuing other political efforts in the future.

Personal life
She is married to John Blanchard, a businessman in real estate. Together, they donated over $2.6 million to Republicans from 2015 to April 2019.

Electoral history

References

External links

1959 births
21st-century American diplomats
21st-century American women
Alabama Republicans
Ambassadors of the United States to Slovenia
American women ambassadors
Businesspeople from Alabama
Living people
People from Montgomery, Alabama
American women diplomats